Etilmon Justus Stark (May, 1867 – January 1, 1962) was an American ragtime composer and arranger, the eldest son of ragtime publisher John Stark.  His best-known work includes the rag time pieces "Trombone Johnsen" (1902), "Billiken Rag" (1913), and "Gum Shoe" (1917), and the arrangements for the collection "Fifteen Standard High Class Rags" (1912) (better known as "The Red Back Book").

Life and Family

Stark was born in Gosport, Indiana and he was known as "Till".  While his birth date has been traditionally cited as 1868, he was actually born in May 1867. E.J. Stark moved to Missouri with his family in his youth.  In 1885, his father, who previously had been a farmer and ice cream store proprietor, took the family to Sedalia, Missouri and opened a music store, John Stark and Son.  John Stark later became a music publisher and made his fortune by publishing Scott Joplin's The Maple Leaf Rag.  All of the Stark children, including sister Eleanor and brother William were talented musically.  However, E.J. was the one who was able to achieve the greatest success.  He died in Maplewood, Missouri.

Career
E.J. Stark became a music instructor, first at the Marmaduke Military Academy in Sweet Springs, Missouri.  When Marmaduke burned in 1896, Stark moved to Wentworth Military Academy in Lexington, Missouri.  Stark organized Wentworth's first band, and stayed as bandmaster from 1896 to 1905, composing The W.M.A. Cadets' March and some of his first rags, including Kyrene and Trombone Johnsen, during his tenure there.  He later wrote several other notable ragtime piano compositions, all published by his father, including a few under the alias "Bud Manchester".  He was also the arranger of a collection of ragtime pieces scored for band which became popularly known as the Red Back Book for its red cover.

Compositions
Bryan and Sewell - Free Silver (1896)
The W.M.A. Cadets' March (1898)
Trombone Johnsen (1902)
Kyrene (1903)
The Black Cat Rag (1905)
Brainstorm Rag (as Bud Manchester) (1907)
Twilight (1907)
Clover Blossoms Rag (1912)
Elaine (1913)
Billiken Rag (1913)
La Mode (1913)
Valse Pensive (1913)
Chicken Tango (1914)
Gum Shoe Fox Trot (1917)
We Are Coming, Uncle Sammy (1917)
Clover Blossoms Rag (as Bud Manchester)

See also
 List of ragtime composers
 Geoff Grainger's Web Pages, http://www.grainger.de/music/composers/starkej.html
 Bill Edward's Web Pages, http://www.perfessorbill.com/comps/ejstark.shtml

References

1867 births
1962 deaths
People from Owen County, Indiana
People from Sedalia, Missouri
People from St. Louis County, Missouri
Ragtime composers